Biejków  is a village in the administrative district of Gmina Promna, in Białobrzegi County, Masovian Voivodeship, east-central Poland.

References

Villages in Białobrzegi County